New Haven Public Schools (NHPS) is a school district serving the city of New Haven, Connecticut.

Wilbur Cross High School and Hillhouse High School are New Haven's two largest public secondary schools and the only non-magnet secondary schools in the district.
Almost all of the district's schools have been renovated under a 15-year, $1.375 billion School Construction Program.

Out of the 45 New Haven Public Schools, there are:
 31 elementary and middle schools
 9 high schools
 4 transitional schools

Statistics and Demographics

 Total students	        20,474
 Total certified teachers	184
 Total full-time staff	        2,500
 Number of schools	        89

Enrollment, by race/ethnicity
Black: 	46%
Hispanic:	37%
White: 	14%
Asian: 	2%
Students eligible for free and reduced-price meals	77%
English learners	12%
Graduation rate 	62%

References

External links

 New Haven Public Schools
 Teacher Portal

School districts in Connecticut
Education in New Haven, Connecticut